The Dux Belgicae secundae ("commander of the second Belgic province") was a senior officer in the army of the Late Roman Empire who was the commander of the limitanei (frontier troops) and of a naval squadron on the so-called Saxon Shore in Gaul.

The office is thought to have been established around 395 AD. At the imperial court, a dux was of the highest class of vir illustris. The Notitia Dignitatum lists for the Gallic part of the Litus Saxonicum ("the Coast of Saxony") two commanders, and their military units, who were charged with securing the coasts of Flanders (Belgica II), of Normandy (Lugdunensis II), and of Brittany (Lugdunensis III), these commanders being the Dux Belgicae secundae and the neighboring Dux Armoricani et Nervicani.

These two commanders were the successors to an official the Comes Maritimi Tractus (Commander of the Coastal Regions), who formerly commanded both the British and the Gallic part of the Saxon Shore. These two commanders maintained coastal defenses until the mid–5th Century. A well known commander was the Frankish king Childeric I (late 5th century).

History 
In the course of the imperial reforms under Emperor Diocletian new military offices were introduced in Britain and Gaul. At that time the limes (border wall/marker) of the Saxon coast were established on both sides of the English Channel. The castles guarding the heavily exposed sections and estuaries were partially restored or modified from existing structures. Their garrisons had the task of repelling raiders and impeding the access of invaders to the interior. The main responsibility for securing both coasts was in the middle of the 4th century placed in a Comes Maritimi Tractus. In 367, an invasion of Britain by several barbarian peoples, almost completely wiping out units of the local provincial forces, killing the coastal commander Nectaridus. His area of responsibility must have been divided thereafter—by 395 at the latest—into three military districts. This most likely was also to prevent a military commander from having too many soldiers under his command, thus enabling him to start an uprising (such as the usurpation of the British fleet commander Carausius). For the Gallic part of the Saxon coast, two new ducal regions were created, which existed until the early 5th century.

In the final phase of Roman rule over Gaul, Childeric, as civilian administrator and commander of the warrior groups around the town of Tournai in the north of the province, acted as the commander of the Salian Franks. Tournai served as his residence and administrative headquarters. His power was based upon, among other things, the weapon forges here. In Childeric's grave, discovered in 1653, Eastern Roman gold coins, a gold-plated officer's coat (paludamentum), and a golden onion button brooch were found. The first was interpreted as renumeratio (payment) for services rendered, the last as an insignia of the late Roman army.

It is unclear whether Childeric acted as merely a Roman general or independently as a king (rex gloriosissimus); most likely, both offices had already merged. Childeric was probably still loyal to the late Roman military aristocracy of Gaul. In any case, it was not the formal powers that mattered, but the power based on commanding a military resources. This combining of civilian and military offices in his hands suggests that Childeric had a prominent position among barbarian army commanders. He had probably been directly confirmed in his office by the administration of Odoacer in Italy and also by the Eastern Roman imperial court. It is believed that he had precedence before the other federal commander in chief. As rex or princeps he would also have been entitled to bestow religious and secular offices and the associated titles—such as patricius, comes, and dux—to deserving Teutons or Romans in his domain (regnum).

Administrative staff 

The officium (administrative staff) of the dux included the following offices: 

 Princeps ex eodem corpore (chancellor from the ranks of the army)
 Numerarii (two accountants)
 Commentariensus (legal counsel)
 Adiutor (assistant)
 Subadiuva (assistant)
 Regerendarius (administrator)
 Exceptores (secretaries)
 Singulares et reliquos officiales (notaries (or bodyguards) and other civil servants)

Forts, officers, and units 
In addition to the administrative staff (officium), eight tribunes or prefects and their units were available to the Dux (sub dispositione, "at discretion"):
 Equites Dalmatae (no officer stated).
 Praefectus classis Sambricae, commander of a flotilla of patrol ships (Navis lusoria), the fourth since the Century on the Somme was stationed. Their bases were in locus Quartensis, or Vicus ad Quantiam, (Port d'Etaples, France, north of the Somme estuary) and locus Hornensis (possibly Cap Hornu, Saint-Valery-sur-Somme, France).

Tribunus militum Nerviorum, a prefect for Sarmatian settlers (Praefectus Sarmatarum gentilium, inter Renos et Tambianos secundae provinciae Belgicae), and four prefects that commanded the contingents of Germanic Laeti:
 Praefectus laetorum Nerviorum in Fanomantis (modern Famars, Picardie, France)
 Praefectus laetorum Batavorum Nemetacensium in Atrabatis (modern Arras, Pas de Calais, France)
 Praefectus laetorum Batavorum Contraginnensium in Noviomago
 Praefectus laetorum gentilium in Remo et Silvanectas
Their shield emblems are not shown in the Notitia Dignitatum.

The Dux had originally more units under his command. Arnold Hugh Martin Jones identified the origin of some units as being from the Gallic army. They originated from Belgica II. Their names are the same as the well-known cities of this province:
 Geminiacenses, a legio comitatenses, (from Geminiacum – modern Liberchies, Hainaut, Belgium); comitatenses – having been assigned to a field army, but without being awarded the higher designation of "palatine" status
 Cotoriacenses, a legio comitatenses (from Cotoriacum – West Flanders)
 Prima Flavia (Prima Flavia Metis) (a pseudo-comitatenses from Metis)
Unlike the vexillarii of other duces, these units are not shown as being under the command of the Dux Belgicae II. It seems that this province had diminished influence after the destruction of the border units on the Rhine (Rhine crossing of 406 AD), at which many of their units were transferred to the field army.

See also 
 Count of the Saxon Shore

References

Further reading 
 Insignia viri illustris magistri peditum, Occ. V
 Heinrich Beck and others (eds): Lexicon of Germanic archeology. Volume 18 de Gruyter, Berlin-New York 2001, p. 524
 Stefanie Dick: Königtum, Barbaren auf dem Thron in: Spektrum der Wissenschaft Spezial/Archäologie - Geschichte - Kultur, Nr. 1/2015, p. 29-30.
 Eugen Ewig: Die Merowinger und das Frankenreich, 5. aktualisierte Auflage, Stuttgart 2006, p. 17.
 Stephen Johnson: The Roman Forts of the Saxon Shore, 1976 JC man, in VA Maxfield (Eds.): The Saxon Shore, 1989, pp. 45-77.
 Arnold Hugh Martin Jones: The Later Roman Empire, 284-602. A Social, Economic and Administrative Survey. 2 vols. Johns Hopkins University Press, Baltimore, 1986,  (paperback edition).
 Dieter Geuenich (ed.): The Franks and the Alemanni to the "Battle of Zuelpich" (496/97). Walter de Gruyter, Berlin 1998, p. 97
 Hans DL Viereck: Die Römische Flotte [The Roman Fleet], Classis Romana. Koehler Verlagsgesellschaft mbH, Hamburg 1996, p. 258 .

External links 
 The Dux in the Notitia Dignitatum (English)

 Saxon Shore